Tola is a given name and surname. The given name is a variant of Toni. Notable people who use this name include the following:

Given name 
 Tola (biblical figure), Biblical judge of Israel
 Tola, Biblical son of Issachar from the Old Testament
 Tola, co-founder with husband Orca of the Abbey at Abbotsbury, England in the 11th Century 
 Tola of Clonard, a saint in the Irish tradition
 Tola Kasali (born 1950), Nigerian politician
 Tola Mankiewiczówna (1900 – 1985), Polish singer and actress
 Tola Szlagowska (born 1992), Polish singer
 Tola, stagename of Carlos Mario Gallego, Columbian journalist and cartoonist of Tola y Maruja

Surname 
 Afrim Tola or Afrim Tole (born 1970), Albanian footballer
 Carlos Julio Arosemena Tola (1888 – 1952), Ecuadorian politician (former President)
 Efisio Tola (1803 – 1833), Italian patriot
Erjon Tola (born 1986), Albanian alpine ski racer
 Fate Tola (born 1987), Ethiopian long-distance runner
 Helen Bekele Tola (born 1994), Ethiopian long-distance runner
 Heng Tola, Cambodian film director and producer
 Kejsi Tola (born 1992), Albanian singer and the winner of Albanian Idol 2007
 Kore Tola (born 1997), Ethiopian middle-distance runner
 Meseret Belete Tola (born 1999), Ethiopian long-distance runner
 Meseret Defar Tola (born 1983), Ethiopian long-distance runner
 Mirjam Tola (born 1972), Albanian operatic soprano
 Nub Tola (born 1995), Cambodian footballer
 Pamela Tola (1981), Finnish actress
 Pasquale Tola  (1800–1874), Italian judge, politician and historian
 Roberto Tola (born 1966), Italian jazz guitarist and composer
 Shura Kitata Tola (born 1996), Ethiopian long-distance runner
 Tamirat Tola (born 1991), Ethiopian long-distance runner
 Tadese Tola (born 1987), Ethiopian long-distance runner
 Tesfaye Tola (born 1974), Ethiopian long-distance runner
 Virginia Tola (born 1976), Argentine operatic soprano
 Workenesh Tola (born 1980), Ethiopian long-distance runner
 Wut Tola (born 2002), Cambodian footballer
 Zenebech Tola, birthname of Maryam Yusuf Jamal (born 1984), Ethiopian-born Bahraini middle-distance runner

Nickname
Tola Vologe, nickname of Anatole Vologe (1909 – 1944), French field hockey player

Middle name
 Sandra Tola Casañas birthname of Sandra Tola Harvey whose stage name was Sandée (1962 – 2008), American vocalist
 José Tola Pasquel (1914 – 1999), Peruvian engineer

See also

 Girma Tolla (born 1975), Ethiopian long-distance runner
 Tona (name)
 Tova
 Tala (name)
 Toda (surname)
 Tol (surname)
 Tolga (given name)
 Tolo (surname)
 Toma (name)
 Tora (given name)
 Tora (surname)